Fed-batch culture is, in the broadest sense,  defined as an operational technique in biotechnological processes where one or more nutrients (substrates) are fed (supplied) to the bioreactor during cultivation and in which the product(s) remain in the bioreactor until the end of the run.  An alternative description of the method is that of a culture in which "a base medium supports initial cell culture and a feed medium is added to prevent nutrient depletion".  It is also a type of semi-batch culture. In some cases, all the nutrients are fed into the bioreactor. The advantage of the fed-batch culture is that one can control concentration of fed-substrate in the culture liquid at arbitrarily desired levels (in many cases, at low levels).

Generally speaking, fed-batch culture is superior to conventional batch culture when controlling concentrations of a nutrient (or nutrients) affects the yield or productivity of the desired metabolite.

Types of bioprocesses 
The types of bioprocesses for which fed-batch culture is effective can be summarized as follows:

1. Substrate inhibition[1]

Nutrients such as methanol, ethanol, acetic acid, and aromatic compounds inhibit the growth of microorganisms even at relatively low concentrations. By adding such substrates properly lag-time can be shortened and the inhibition of the cell growth markedly reduced.

2. High cell density (High cell concentration)[1]

In a batch culture, to achieve very high cell concentrations, e.g. 50-100 g of dry cells/L, high initial concentrations of the nutrients in the medium are needed. At such high concentrations, the nutrients become inhibitory, even though they have no such effect at the normal concentrations used in batch cultures.

3. Glucose effect (Crabtree effect)[1]

In the production of baker's yeast from malt wort or molasses it has been recognized since early 1900s that ethanol is produced even in the presence of sufficient dissolved oxygen (DO) if an excess of sugar is present in the culture liquid. Ethanol is a main cause of low cell yield. Aerobic ethanol formation in the presence of glucose concentration is known as glucose effect or Crabtree effect. To reduce this effect, a fed-batch process is generally employed for baker's yeast production. In aerobic cultures of Escherichia coli and Bacillus subtilis, organic acids such as acetic acid, (and in lesser amounts, lactic acid and formic acid), are produced as byproducts when sugar concentration is high, and these acids inhibit cell growth as well as show deteriorating effect on the metabolic activities. The formation of these acids are called bacterial Crabtree effects.

4. Catabolite repression[1]

When a microorganism is provided with a rapidly metabolizable carbon-energy source such as glucose, the resulting increase in the intracellular concentration of ATP leads to the repression of enzyme(s) biosynthesis, thus causing a slower metabolization of the energy source. This phenomenon is known as catabolite repression. Many enzymes, especially those involved in catabolic pathways, are subject to this repressive regulation. A powerful method of overcoming the catabolite repression in the enzyme biosynthesis is a fed-batch culture in which glucose concentration in the culture liquid is kept low, where growth is restricted, and the enzyme biosynthesis is derepressed. Slow feeding of glucose in penicillin fermentation by Penicillium chrysogenum is a classical example in the category.

5. Auxotrophic mutants[1]

In a microbial process employing an auxotrophic mutant (nutritionally requiring mutant), excess supply of the required nutrient results in abundant cell growth with little accumulation of the desired metabolite due to feedback inhibition and /or end-product repression. Starvation of the required nutrient, however, lowers cell growth as well as the overall production of the desired metabolite, as the production rate is usually proportional to the cell concentration. In such a bioprocess, the accumulation of the desired metabolite can be maximized by growing the mutant on a limited amount of the required nutrient. To cultivate the mutant on a low concentration of the required nutrient, it is fed to the batch culture at a controlled rate. This technique is often used in industrial amino acid productions with the auxotrophic mutants. An example is lysine production with homoserine- or threonine/methionine-requiring mutant of Corynebacterium glutamicum being lacking for homoserine dehydrogenase gene.

6. Expression control of a gene with a repressible promoter
 
Transcription of a gene having a repressible promoter upstream of the open reading frame is repressed by combination of the so-called holo-repressor with the operator region on the DNA. When a specified chemical compound exists in the culture liquid, the compound (or its metabolite) in the cells combines as co-repressor with an apo-repressor (a kind of transcription factor) to form the holo-repressor. 
Keeping the concentration of this compound as low as possible (while still allowing for sufficient cell growth) permits continued expression of the regulated gene. Fed-batch culture is a powerful technique to do so. Examples of the repressible promoter are trp promoter and phoA promoter.

7. Extension of operation time, supplement of water lost by evaporation, and decreasing viscosity of culture broth[1]

Types of culturing strategies

High cell-density culture 
The fed-batch strategy is typically used in bio-industrial processes to reach a high cell density in the bioreactor.
Mostly the feed solution is highly concentrated to avoid dilution of the bioreactor.
Production of heterologous proteins by fed-batch cultures of recombinant microorganisms have been extensively studied.

The controlled addition of the nutrient directly affects the growth rate of the culture and helps to avoid overflow metabolism (formation of side metabolites, such as acetate for Escherichia coli, lactic acid in mammalian cell cultures, ethanol  in Saccharomyces cerevisiae), oxygen limitation (anaerobiosis).

Constantly-fed-batch culture 
The simplest fed-batch culture is the one in which the feed rate of a growth-limiting substrate is constant, i.e. the feed rate is invariant during the culture. This case is shown in the graph (here the culture volume is variable). This type of the fed-batch culture is named constantly-fed-batch culture (CFBC), and is well established mathematically  and experimentally. In the CFBC, both cases of fixed-volume CFBC and variable-volume CFBC were studied.

Exponential-fed-batch culture 
Under ideal condition, cells grow exponentially. If the feed rate of the growth-limiting substrate is increased in proportion to the exponential growth rate of the cells, it is possible to maintain the cells' specific growth rate for a long time while keeping the substrate concentration in the culture liquid at a constant level. The required feed rate (volumetric or mass) must be increased exponentially with time so that this mode of fed-batch culture is called exponentially-fed-batch culture (EFBC).

Substrate limitation offers the possibility to control the reaction rates to avoid technological limitations connected to the cooling of the reactor and oxygen transfer. Substrate limitation also allows the metabolic control, to avoid osmotic effects, catabolite repression and overflow metabolism of side products.

Control strategy 
Different strategies can be used to control the growth in a fed-batch process:

References

Bioreactors
Biotechnology